Julia Arnall (21 November 1928 – 8 November 2018) was a German-born British-based actress.

Personal life
Born Julia Ilse Hendrike Irmgard von Stein Liebenstein zu Bachfeld in 1928 in Munich, she spent her childhood in Berlin, where her father was an army officer. She attended drama school in Vienna. After the war ended she married Desmond Arnall, a British Army officer who had been posted to Berlin. In 1950, she came to Britain with her husband and her young son. In 1952, her second son was born.

She started her life as a model before becoming an actress with the Rank Organisation. She appeared in bit parts in a few films before starring in the 1956 film Lost. After departing Rank, she continued acting, appearing in a few episodes of television shows, including The Saint and Emergency – Ward 10.

In 1956 she and Arnall divorced. In 1960 she married a film, television, and jazz critic, with whom she had a daughter.

Selected filmography
 I Am a Camera (1955)
 Value for Money (1955)
 Simon and Laura (1955)
 Man of the Moment (1955)
 Lost (1956)
 House of Secrets (1956)
 The Man Without a Body (1957)
 Mark of the Phoenix (1958)
 Model for Murder (1959)
 Carry On Regardless (1961)
 The Double Man (1967)

Television
 Danger Man – Josetta (Series 1 Episode 3) (1960) as Josetta; (Series 1 Episode 38 – Dead Man Walks) as Natalie Smith
 Ghost Squad – Broken Doll (Series 1 Episode 4) (1961) as Julie Peters
 The Avengers – Intercrime (Series 2 Episode 15) (1963) as Hilda Stern
 The Saint – Locate and Destroy (Series 5 Episode 12) (1966) as Ingrid

References

External links
 

1928 births
2018 deaths
20th-century British actresses
Age controversies
British film actresses
British television actresses
German actresses
People from Munich